The 2012 Sudan Premier League (or SudaniOne Premier League for sponsorship reasons) was the 41st edition of the highest club level football competition in Sudan. Al-Hilal took out the championship.

Standings

References
RSSSF.com

Sudan Premier League seasons
Sudan
Sudan
football